Koingnaas is a village in Namakwa District Municipality in the Northern Cape province of South Africa. It is located 65 km south of Kleinzee.

Established in 1970, Koingnaas was once a flourishing diamond-mining town and satellite town to Kleinzee. Since De Beers' departure, the population has fallen rapidly from its peak of about 1,000 inhabitants.

References

Populated places in the Kamiesberg Local Municipality
Populated places established in 1970
1970 establishments in South Africa